The 2020–21 Lehigh Mountain Hawks men's basketball team represented Lehigh University in the 2020–21 NCAA Division I men's basketball season. The Mountain Hawks, led by 14th-year head coach Brett Reed, played their home games at Stabler Arena in Bethlehem, Pennsylvania as members of the Patriot League. With the creation of mini-divisions to cut down on travel due to the COVID-19 pandemic, they play in the Central Division.

Previous season
The Mountain Hawks finished the 2019–20 season 11–21, 7–11 in Patriot League play to finish in a tie for eighth place. They defeated Loyola (MD) in the first round of the Patriot League tournament, before losing in the quarterfinals to Colgate.

Roster

Schedule and results 

|-
!colspan=12 style=| Patriot League regular season

|-
!colspan=12 style=| Patriot League tournament
|-

|-

Source

References

Lehigh Mountain Hawks men's basketball seasons
Lehigh Mountain Hawks
Lehigh Mountain Hawks men's basketball
Lehigh Mountain Hawks men's basketball